St Mary's GAA is a Gaelic Athletic Association club based in the villages of Ballineen and Enniskean, County Cork, Ireland. Founded in 1968, the club participates in both Gaelic football and hurling competitions. The club is a member of the Carbery division of Cork GAA. In 2009, the club won its first West Cork Junior A Football Championship. The club won the same competition in 2014, along with the Junior A Football league and Junior C Football league. The club has undertaken some joint fundraising activities with the local Enniskeane camogie club.

Achievements
 West Cork Junior A Football Championship (2): 2009, 2014
 Cork Junior B Football Championship (1): 2004
 Cork Junior B Hurling Championship (0): (runners-Up in 1986, 2001, 2008)
 West Cork Junior B Hurling Championship (4): 1986, 1993, 2001, 2008
 West Cork Junior B Football Championship (2): 1980, 2004
 West Cork Minor B Hurling Championship (5): 1969, 1970, 1971 (as Fineen Rovers), 2002, 2006
 West Cork Minor B Football Championship (4): 1970 (as Fineen Rovers), 2003, 2006, 2009 (as Ahán Gaels)
 West Cork Under-21 B Hurling Championship (2): 1983, 2012
 West Cork Under-21 B Football Championship (5): 1978, 1979, 2002, 2006, 2010

Notable players
 John Caulfield

References

External links
 StMarysCLG.com (archived 2013)

Gaelic games clubs in County Cork
Hurling clubs in County Cork
Gaelic football clubs in County Cork